Lewis Caunce (20 April 1911 - 1978) was an English professional association football goalkeeper of the 1930s. Born in Earlestown, he joined Rochdale from Huddersfield Town in 1932, where he made 18 appearances for the club. He left to join Wigan Athletic in 1933, spending two seasons with the Cheshire League club before returning to the Football League with Oldham Athletic in 1935.

On Boxing Day 1935, Caunce played in goal for Oldham in their 4–13 defeat against Tranmere Rovers, a Football League record for most goals scored in a game. Caunce notably saved a penalty during the game to prevent Tranmere centre forward Bunny Bell from scoring 10 goals, and Caunce's teammate Tommy Williamson remarked years later that despite the scoreline, the keeper had "played a blinder".

Caunce played 134 league games for Oldham before his football career was ended prematurely by the outbreak of the Second World War.

References

1911 births
1978 deaths
English footballers
People from Newton-le-Willows
Huddersfield Town A.F.C. players
Rochdale A.F.C. players
Oldham Athletic A.F.C. players
Wigan Athletic F.C. players
Association football goalkeepers